Midlands 3 West (South) is a level 8 English Rugby Union league and level 3 of the Midlands League, made up of teams from the southern part of the West Midlands region including clubs from parts of Birmingham and the West Midlands, Herefordshire, Warwickshire, Worcestershire and sometimes Oxfordshire, with home and away matches played throughout the season.  When this division began in 1992 it was known as Midlands West 2, until it was split into two regional divisions called Midlands 4 West (North) and Midlands 4 West (South) ahead of the 2000–01 season.  Further restructuring of the Midlands leagues ahead of the 2009–10 season, led to the current name of Midlands 3 West (South).

Promoted teams tend to move up to Midlands 2 West (South) while demoted teams typically drop to Midlands 4 West (South).  Each year all clubs in the division also take part in the RFU Senior Vase - a level 8 national competition.

2021–22

Participating teams & locations

2020–21
Due to the COVID-19 pandemic, the 2020–21 season was cancelled.

2019–20

Participating teams & locations

2018–19

Participating teams & locations

2017–18

Participating teams & locations

Teams 2016-17
Bedworth (relegated from Midlands 2 West (South))
Droitwich (relegated from Midlands 2 West (South))
Evesham
Ledbury
Manor Park (promoted from Midlands 4 West (South))
Old Coventrians
Old Leamingtonians 
Old Wheatleyans
Rugby St Andrews
Shipston on Stour
Upton-on-Severn (promoted from Midlands 4 West (South))
Woodrush

Teams 2015-16
Cheltenham North
Evesham (promoted from Midlands 4 West (South))
Harbury
Ledbury
Old Coventrians (relegated from Midlands 2 West (South))
Old Leamingtonians (relegated from Midlands 2 West (South))
Old Wheatleyans
Pershore
Rugby Lions (promoted from Midlands 4 West (South))
Shipston on Stour
Southam
Woodrush

Teams 2014-15
Bedworth (relegated from Midlands 2 West (South))
Cheltenham North
Dunlop	(relegated from Midlands 2 West (South))
Harbury (promoted from Midlands 4 West (South))
Ledbury
Manor Park	
Old Wheatleyans
Pershore
Shipston on Stour
Southam	
Upton-on-Severn
Woodrush (promoted from Midlands 4 West (South))

Teams 2013–14
Cheltenham North
Evesham
Kings Norton
Ledbury
Manor Park
Old Wheatleyans
Old Yardleians (promoted from Midlands 4 West (South))
Pershore
Pinley
Shipston on Stour (relegated from Midlands 2 West (South))
Southam
Upton-on-Severn (relegated from Midlands 2 West (South))

Teams 2012–13
Cheltenham North
Evesham
Kings Norton
Ledbury
Old Coventrians
Old Leamingtonians
Old Wheatleyans
Pershore
Pinley
Redditch
Southam
Woodrush

Teams 2009–10
Dunlop
Edwardians
Harbury
Kings Norton
Ledbury 
Old Leamingtonians
Pershore
Redditch
Shipston on Stour  
Southam
Upton upon Severn
Woodrush

Teams 2008–09
Bedworth 
Dunlop 
Edwardians 
Kings Norton
Ledbury 
Old Leamingtonians
Pershore
Shipston on Stour   
Southam
Upton On Severn
Woodrush
Worcester Wanderers

Original teams

Teams in Midlands 3 West (North) and Midlands 3 West (South) were originally part of a single division called Midlands 2 West, which contained the following sides when it was introduced in 1992:

Aston Old Edwardians - promoted from North Midlands 1 (10th)
Coventry Welsh - promoted from Staffordshire/Warwickshire 1 (10th)
Dixonians - promoted from North Midlands 1 (6th)
Handsworth - promoted from Staffordshire 1 (champions)
Kenilworth - promoted from Staffordshire/Warwickshire 1 (7th)
Nuneaton Old Edwardians - promoted from Staffordshire/Warwickshire 1 (6th)
Old Laurentians - promoted from Warwickshire 1 (champions)
Selly Oak - promoted from North Midlands 2 (champions)
Shrewsbury - promoted from North Midlands 1 (11th)
Stratford-upon-Avon - promoted from Staffordshire/Warwickshire 1 (9th)
Tamworth - promoted from Staffordshire/Warwickshire 1 (8th)
West Midlands Police - promoted from North Midlands 1 (8th)
Woodrush - promoted from North Midlands 1 (7th)

Midlands 3 West (South) honours

Midlands West 2 (1992–1993)

Midlands 3 West (North) and Midlands 3 West (South) were originally part of a single tier 8 division called Midlands West 2.  Promotion was to Midlands West 1 and relegation was to either North Midlands 1 or Staffordshire/Warwickshire 1.

Midlands West 2 (1993–1996)

The top six teams from Midlands 1 and the top six from North 1 were combined to create National 5 North, meaning that Midlands 2 West dropped to become a tier 9 league.  Promotion continued to Midlands West 1 while relegation was to either North Midlands 1 or Staffordshire/Warwickshire 1.

Midlands West 2 (1996–2000)

At the end of the 1995–96 season National 5 North was discontinued and Midlands West 2 returned to being a tier 8 league.  Promotion continued to Midlands West 1 while relegation was to either North Midlands 1 or Staffordshire/Warwickshire 1.

Midlands 4 West (South) (2000–2004)

Restructuring ahead of the 2000–01 season saw Midlands West 2 split into two tier 8 regional leagues - Midlands 4 West (North) and Midlands 4 West (South).  Promotion was now to Midlands 3 West (South) and relegation to either North Midlands 1 or Warwickshire 1.

Midlands 4 West (South) (2004–2006)

At the start of the 2004–05 season Midlands 4 West (South) remained at tier 8 of the league system, with promotion continuing to Midlands 3 West (South).  However, the restructuring of the leagues below meant that relegation was now to either North Midlands (South) 1 or Warwickshire 1.

Midlands 4 West (South) (2006–2009)

At the start of the 2006–07 season Midlands 4 West (South) remained at tier 8 of the league system, with promotion continuing to Midlands 3 West (South).  The cancellation of Warwickshire 1 league meant that relegation was now to the newly introduced Midlands 5 West (South).

Midlands 3 West (South) (2009–present)

League restructuring by the RFU meant that Midlands 4 West (North) and Midlands 4 West (South) were renamed as Midlands 3 West (North) and Midlands 3 West (South), with both leagues remaining at tier 8.  Promotion was now to Midlands 2 West (South) (formerly Midlands 3 West (North)) and relegation to Midlands 4 West (South).

Number of league titles

Droitwich (2)
Dunlop (2)
Old Coventrians (2)
Old Yardleians (2)
Earlsdon (1)
Kidderminster Carolians (1)
Ledbury (1)
Luctonians (1)
Newcastle (Staffs) (1)
Nuneaton Old Edwardians (1)
Old Laurentians (1)
Pinley (1)
Rugby Lions (1)
Rugby St Andrews (1)
Selly Oak (1)
Shipston-on-Stour (1)
Shrewsbury (1)
Silhillians (1)
Solihull (1)
Spartans (Midlands) (1)
Stourbridge Lions (1)
Telford Hornets (1)
Upton-on-Severn (1)
Worcester Wanderers (1)

Notes

See also
Midlands RFU
North Midlands RFU
Warwickshire RFU
English rugby union system
Rugby union in England
English Rugby Union Leagues
English rugby union system
Rugby union in England

References

8
4